Bžany may refer to several places:
 Bžany, Stropkov District, village in Stropkov District, Slovakia
 Bžany (Teplice District), village in Teplice District, Czech Republic